Cemal Yanılmaz (2 January 1934 – 6 June 2018) is a Turkish wrestler. He competed in the men's freestyle flyweight at the 1964 Summer Olympics.

References

External links
 

1934 births
2018 deaths
Turkish male sport wrestlers
Olympic wrestlers of Turkey
Wrestlers at the 1964 Summer Olympics
World Wrestling Championships medalists